McFarland, USA (also known as McFarland) is a 2015 American sports drama film directed by Niki Caro, produced by Mark Ciardi and Gordon Gray, written by Christopher Cleveland, Bettina Gilois and Grant Thompson with music composed by Antônio Pinto. The film was co-produced by Walt Disney Pictures and Mayhem Pictures. Based on the true story of a 1987 cross country team from a mainly Latino high school in McFarland, California, the film stars Kevin Costner as Jim White, the school's coach, who leads the team to win a state championship. The film also stars Maria Bello and Morgan Saylor.

McFarland, USA was released on February 20, 2015, received positive reviews from critics, and grossed over $45 million. The film was released on DVD and Blu-ray on June 2, 2015 by Walt Disney Studios Home Entertainment.

Plot
In 1987, football coach Jim White loses his job after he loses his temper and accidentally injures a team player in the locker room. He and his family relocate to his new job at McFarland High School in McFarland, California, which is predominantly Latino. The family has trouble adjusting to the Hispanic neighborhood and lament being unable to afford to live in Bakersfield.

White is first put as assistant football coach, but ultimately loses his coaching status when he pulls an injured player, Johnny Sameniego, out of a game, causing the crass Head Coach Jenks to ask him to step down.

Discovering that some of his students are strong runners, White has Principal Camillo authorize cross-country as a sport and organizes an all-boys team. He enlists Sameniego's help and recruits Thomas Valles, Jose Cardenas, Victor Puentes and brothers David, Damacio and Danny Diaz. All seven have little hope for their future, specifically Valles, who has hardships with his father and nearly throws himself off a bridge before White stops him. Jim's devotion to the team leads to him alienating his family, including forgetting to pick up his daughter Julie's birthday cake.

After a few regional competitions, the team wins its first race. Shortly after, the Diaz brothers are taken off the team by their father, who wants them to work for his team of field pickers instead. In response, White joins them in the fields and convinces them to come to meets and races at earlier and later times of the day, to which they finally address him as "coach". White's wife Cheryl organizes a tamale and car wash sale with the rest of the neighborhood to raise money for new uniforms, where the family and the neighborhood become better acquainted.

Eventually, the McFarland team competes in and qualifies for the State Tournament, and White takes them to the beach to celebrate. White also makes amends with Julie by throwing her a quinceañera with help from the neighbors, though it goes wrong when Julie is taken out on "parade" around the town and the group is attacked by street punks.

Despite the group's insistence that Julie was protected, Jim questions his family's safety in McFarland and interviews for a full-time position at Palo Alto that he was previously offered, upsetting Julie and Thomas. Cheryl implores him to continue to be there for the McFarland team and their friends in the neighborhood, reminding him how much the community has embraced them.

The day of the state championships comes and almost the whole McFarland community accompanies the team to the race. Because of White's rigorous training and the efforts of the entire team, McFarland upsets the other more favored schools and comes in first. After the race, Jim turns down the Palo Alto position and embraces his family and the team.

A series of texts shows that under White's guidance, the team becomes outstandingly successful, winning nine state titles over fourteen years. All the members of the first team become the first in their families to go to college or into military careers. Almost all members continue to attend the practices that Jim White held for successive school cross country teams even after graduation from college. White continued teaching and coaching in McFarland until his retirement in 2003 and after that he continued living in McFarland.

Cast

Production
William Broyles Jr. was hired to write the screenplay for the film, which was in development since 2004. Negotiations for Kevin Costner to star were finalized in July 2013. Principal photography took place in Camarillo, California, and many of McFarland's residents were extras in the movie.

Historical accuracy
In an interview, Jim White noted that while the film was based on a true story, it was not a documentary. He acknowledged that not everything in the film was factual, but that "it's still an enjoyable movie... it turned out fine." Some of the more notable differences included:

 Jim White had not been fired from numerous prior teaching jobs before starting at McFarland. He started teaching in the McFarland school district after graduating from Pepperdine University in 1964. During that time, McFarland was predominantly white in terms of demographics. White taught different subjects at numerous grade levels (fifth grade science, seventh and eighth grade woodshop, and PE) before starting his coaching career in 1980. White retired in 2003 after 23 years of coaching.
 White did not establish the cross-country team at the school, but instead restarted it after it had been dropped for a year. He rebuilt both the boys' and girls' cross-country teams, despite only the boys' team being featured in the film. Similarly, White took both teams to the California coast beach at Cayucos during the 1985 (not 1987) season.
 Not all runners from the 1987 team are featured in the film. Director Niki Caro wanted to feature more family in the film, so Luis Partida, who was on the team, was replaced with David Diaz, Damacio and Danny's brother. David, however, graduated the year before McFarland's first state title win.
 Jim White and his wife Cheryl have three daughters, not two. Their oldest daughter, Tami, does not appear in the film. Julie and Jami are also portrayed relatively younger than their real ages at the time of McFarland's first state title win in 1987 (all three were in college during that time).
 Danny Diaz was not overweight as a child. He was, however, the seventh person on the team and still instrumental to its 1987 state title win.
 McFarland was not rivals with Palo Alto High School (the schools are 4 hours apart) nor did the schools ever race each other. This was made up to serve the plot.

Release
The film was previously slated for a November 21, 2014 release, under the title McFarland, but was pushed back to February 20, 2015 and given a new title. The film was released in Canada under its original title, McFarland.

Home media 
McFarland, USA was released on DVD and Blu-ray on June 2, 2015 by Walt Disney Studios Home Entertainment.

Soundtrack

Reception

Box office 
McFarland, USA grossed $44.5 million in North America and $1.2 million in other territories for a total gross of $45.7 million.

The film opened in North America on February 20, 2015 and earned $11 million in its opening weekend, finishing 4th at the box office.

Critical response
The review aggregator website Rotten Tomatoes has reported an 80% approval rating, based on 120 reviews, with a rating average of 6.7/10. The site's critical consensus reads, "Disney's inspirational sports drama formula might be old hat, but McFarland, USA proves it still works — especially with a talented director and eminently likable star in the mix." On Metacritic, which assigns a normalized rating, the film has a score of 60 out of 100, based on 32 critics, indicating "mixed or average reviews". In CinemaScore polls conducted during the opening weekend, cinema audiences gave the film an average grade of "A" on an A+ to F scale.

Stephen Farber of The Hollywood Reporter gave a positive review, writing that "While the beats of the story are often stock, the picture benefits from sensitive direction by New Zealander Niki Caro and from a most appealing performance by Kevin Costner." James Rocchi of TheWrap wrote "A feel-good movie that earns all those good feelings, McFarland USA might be running on a predetermined track, but the heart it shows along the journey is what makes it a winner." A. O. Scott of The New York Times described the film favorably as "a slick and safe Disney version of a fascinating and complicated reality", and that "Mr. Costner, with his knack for grumpy understatement, manages both to dominate the film and to deflect attention from himself."

Accolades

McFarland, USA was nominated at the 2015 Teen Choice Awards in the category Choice Movie: Drama.

References

External links

2015 films
2010s sports drama films
American track and field films
American sports drama films
Films directed by Niki Caro
Teen sports films
Films about competitions
Films about race and ethnicity
Films set in California
Films set in Idaho
Films set in 1987
Films shot in California
2010s Spanish-language films
Sports films based on actual events
Biographical films about educators
Walt Disney Pictures films
2015 drama films
Films scored by Antônio Pinto
2010s English-language films
2010s American films